Doris Bush Nungarrayi is an Australian Aboriginal artist (born c. 1942, in Haasts Bluff, Northern Territory). She is a painter at the Aboriginal-owned Papunya Tjupi art centre in Papunya, an Indigenous Australian community northwest of Alice Springs.

Her first solo exhibition "Doris Bush Nungarrayi: This is a Love Story" opened at Damien Minton Gallery, Sydney in 2012. Her work is held in the Maquarie Bank Collection, Artbank, and the University of Western Sydney collection.

Group exhibitions

References

Australian Aboriginal artists
1942 births
Living people